The Gulf rupee (Arabic: روبية خليجية) was the official currency used in the British protectorates of the Arabian Peninsula that are around the Persian Gulf between 1959 and 1966. These areas today form the countries of Kuwait, Bahrain, Qatar, Oman, and the United Arab Emirates. It was issued by the Government of India and the Reserve Bank of India and was equivalent to the Indian rupee.

History
To the middle of the 20th century, the Indian rupee was also used as the official currency in the emirates on the eastern Arabian Peninsula, namely Kuwait, Bahrain, Qatar, the Trucial States, and Oman. That meant, in effect, that the Indian rupee was the common currency in those territories as well as in India. The Indian rupee was pegged to the British pound at a rate of 13 Indian rupees = 1 pound.

The Government of India had complained of gold traffickers in the Gulf region whose base of operations was constantly being broadened, especially in Kuwait, Bahrain and Dubai. Smugglers used to take gold to the Indian sub-continent and return with Indian rupees which were valid for circulation in the region and were exchanged for more valuable foreign currencies to be used by the smugglers to buy more gold. Towards the end of the 1950s, the volume of gold trafficking had become so large that it inevitably precipitated a serious depletion in the foreign cash reserves at the Indian Reserve Bank and was causing economic damage arising directly from the smuggling operations.

As a result of the strain on India's foreign reserves, in 1959 the Indian government created the Gulf rupee, initially at par with the Indian rupee. It was introduced as a replacement for the Indian rupee for circulation exclusively outside the country. Effectively, the common currency area now did not include India.

On 6 June 1966, India devalued the Gulf rupee against the Indian rupee. Following the devaluation, several of the states still using the Gulf rupee adopted their own currencies. Kuwait had adopted the Kuwaiti dinar in 1961, pegged to the Indian rupee, which was still pegged to the pound sterling. Bahrain created the Bahraini dinar in 1965, at the rate of 1 dinar = 10 rupees. Qatar and most of the Trucial States (after 1971, United Arab Emirates) adopted the Qatar and Dubai riyal, which was equal to the Gulf rupee prior to its devaluation, effectively the Indian rupee value. Abu Dhabi used the Bahraini dinar until 1973. Oman continued to use the Gulf rupee until 1970, with the government backing the currency at its old peg to the pound, when it adopted the Omani rial.

Banknotes
Notes were issued in denominations of 1 rupee by the Indian government and 5, 10 and 100 rupees by the Reserve Bank of India. The notes were in designs very similar to the standard Indian notes but were printed in different colours. While the 1 rupee and 10 rupee notes were printed in red, the 5 rupee notes were printed in orange and the 100 rupee notes were printed in green. The serial numbers of the banknotes issued in all denominations were prefixed by a Z.

References

External links

The Bank Notes of the Qatar and Dubai Currency Board
Gulf Rupees - A History

style="height:40px"

|-

Currencies of Asia
Currencies of India
Modern obsolete currencies
Currencies introduced in 1959
Currencies of Kuwait
Currencies of Bahrain
Currencies of Oman
Currencies of the United Arab Emirates